The Tartu GP was a one-day road cycling race in Tartu, Estonia. It was first run in 2001 and became part of the UCI Europe Tour as a 1.1 event in 2005. The most successful rider was Jaan Kirsipuu with three consecutive victories. The race was discontinued in 2012 and has instead been run as the final stage of the Tour of Estonia since that race's inception in 2013.

Past winners

External links 
 

UCI Europe Tour races
Cycle races in Estonia
Recurring sporting events established in 2001
2001 establishments in Estonia
Summer events in Estonia
Defunct cycling races in Estonia
2012 disestablishments in Estonia
Recurring sporting events disestablished in 2012
Sport in Tartu